The North Slope Borough is the northernmost borough in the US state of Alaska and thus, the northernmost county or equivalent of the United States as a whole. As of the 2020 census, the population was 11,031. The borough seat and largest city is Utqiaġvik (known as Barrow from 1901 to 2016), which is also the northernmost settlement in the United States.

History
The borough was established in 1972 by an election of the majority Indigenous people in the region, following Congressional passage of the Alaska Native Claims Settlement Act. Most are Inupiat. The borough was named for the Alaska North Slope basin. In 1974 it adopted a Home Rule Charter, enabling it to exercise any legitimate governmental power. The borough has first-class status and exercises the powers of planning, zoning, taxation, and schools.

In 2020 airline Ravn Alaska went into bankruptcy and ended operations. The government of North Slope Borough attempted to take control of the airline's assets in an attempt to keep flights and shipments coming to the community, but the Alaska Attorney General stated that the borough did not have that authority.

Government
It has a seven-member assembly body, elected to staggered three-year terms. The borough's executive and administrative powers are vested in a mayor, who is limited to two consecutive three-year terms.

Geography
The borough is larger than 39 states.

Its western coastline is along the Chukchi Sea, while its eastern shores (beyond Point Barrow) are on the Beaufort Sea.

The North Slope Borough is the largest county-level political subdivision in the United States by area, with a larger land area than the state of Utah (Utah is the 13th-largest state in the nation).  Although the adjacent Yukon-Koyukuk Census Area is larger in area, it has no borough-level government.  The borough is the fourth-least densely populated county-level entity in the United States.  (The Yukon-Koyukuk Census Area is the least densely populated county-level entity).

Adjacent boroughs and census areas
 Yukon-Koyukuk Census Area, Alaska - southeast
 Northwest Arctic Borough, Alaska - southwest
It shares its eastern border with Yukon, Canada, which has no subdivisions.

National protected areas

 Alaska Maritime National Wildlife Refuge (part of the Chukchi Sea unit)
 Cape Lisburne
 Cape Thompson
 Arctic National Wildlife Refuge (part)
 Mollie Beattie Wilderness (part)
 Gates of the Arctic National Park and Preserve (part)
 Gates of the Arctic Wilderness (part)
 Noatak National Preserve (part)
 Noatak Wilderness (part)

Other federal areas
 National Petroleum Reserve–Alaska

Demographics

2020 census
As of the census of 2020, there were 11,031 people and 1,979 households in the borough. The racial makeup of the borough was 53.2% Native American or Alaska Native, 32.7% White, 4.3% Hispanic or Latino, 1.8% Native Hawaiian or Pacific Islander, 1.6% African American, and 5.3% were from two or more races. 4.6% of the population were veterans and 6.3% of the population was born outside of the United States. The average household size was 3.36 people. 7.9% of the population were under the age of 5, 26.8% were under the age of 18, 65.7% were between the ages of 18 and 64, and 7.5% were age 65 or older. 62.4% of the population were male and 37.6% were female. 86.2% of households contained a computer with 69.8% of households having a broadband Internet connection. 89.7% of the population had a high school diploma or higher with 16.5% having a Bachelor's degree or higher. 79.0% of the population were in the civilian labor force. (72.8% of women) The median household income was $79,306 with the average per capita income from May 2019 to April 2020 was $48,730. 11.4% of the population were in poverty.

2010 census
As of the census of 2010, there were 9,430 people, 2,109 households, and 1,524 families residing in the borough. The racial makeup of the borough was 33.37% White, 1% Black or African American, 54.08% Native American, mostly Inuit, 4.51% Asian, 1.1% Pacific Islander, 0.71% from other races, and 5.23% from two or more races. 2.64% of the population was Hispanic or Latino of any race. 42.84% reported speaking Iñupiaq or "Eskimo" at home, while 4.21% reported speaking Tagalog.

2000 census
As of the census of 2000, there were 7,385 people. The racial makeup was 17.09% White, 0.72% Black or African American, 68.38% Native American, mostly Inuit, 5.92% Asian, 0.84% Pacific Islander, 0.50% from other races, and 6.55% from two or more races.  2.37% of the population was Hispanic or Latino of any race.

There were 2,109 households, out of which 48.10% had children under the age of 18 living with them, 43.3% were married couples living together, 18.3% had a female householder with no husband present, and 27.70% were non-families. 21.4% of all households were made up of individuals, and 1.9% had someone living alone who was 65 years of age or older.  The average household size was 3.45 and the average family size was 4.05.

In the borough, the population was spread out, with 38.2% under the age of 18, 9.50% from 18 to 24, 30.1% from 25 to 44, 18.10% from 45 to 64, and 4.2% who were 65 years of age or older.  The median age was 27 years. For every 100 females, there were 112.50 males.  For every 100 females age 18 and over, there were 113.90 males.

2020 Census

Politics

Former mayor Eugene Brower, Charlotte Brower's husband, was convicted of tax evasion involving contractor kickbacks in the 1980s.

Former mayor George Ahmaogak had billed the Borough for a family vacation in Hawaii. His wife Maggie, was later convicted of embezzlement from the Alaska Eskimo Whaling Commission in 2015.

Edward Itta succeeded George Ahmaogak and served two terms, 2005–2011.

In 2011 Charlotte Brower defeated Ahmaogak in a runoff election after his Hawaii vacation was revealed. She was recalled in April 2016, after it was reported the year before that her office had made numerous donations to individuals (including family members), sports clubs and other groups that amounted to more than $800,000 since 2011.

In July 2016 Harry K. Brower Jr., Charlotte Brower's brother-in-law, was first elected  in a run-off election to serve the rest of Charlotte Brower's second term.

Harry K. Brower Jr. ran for a full term as mayor in October 2017, but was forced into a November runoff against his nephew, Frederick Brower, where he easily won a full 3-year term.

In the 2020 presidential election, North Slope Borough was the county or equivalent with the highest percentage of Native Americans won by Donald Trump, after Joe Biden flipped Ziebach County, South Dakota. It was also the only borough or equivalent with a majority of Alaska Natives won by Trump.

Economics
"Among all North Slope Borough communities, a higher percentage of Nuiqsut households use subsistence resources for more than half of their diet."

Communities

Cities
Anaktuvuk Pass
Atqasuk
Kaktovik
Nuiqsut
Point Hope
Utqiaġvik (borough seat)
Wainwright

Census-designated places
Point Lay
Prudhoe Bay

Other unincorporated places
Alpine
Deadhorse
Sagwon
Umiat

Education
The borough has a single school district: North Slope Borough School District.

See also

Eskimo
Inuit
Iñupiat
Iñupiaq
List of airports in Alaska
Nalukataq
Thetis Mound

References

External links

North-Slope.org - Official Borough Website
Borough map, 2000 census: Alaska Department of Labor
Borough map, 2010 census: Alaska Department of Labor

 
Chukchi Sea
Beaufort Sea
1972 establishments in Alaska
Populated places established in 1972